Goulia is a town in north-western Ivory Coast. It is a sub-prefecture and commune of Kaniasso Department in Folon Region, Denguélé District.

In 2014, the population of the sub-prefecture of Goulia was 18,590.

Villages
The 18 villages of the sub-prefecture of Goulia and their population in 2014 are:

References

Sub-prefectures of Folon Region
Communes of Folon Region